Qubadli District is one of the 66 districts of Azerbaijan. It is located in the south-west of the country and belongs to the East Zangezur Economic Region. The district borders the districts of Lachin, Khojavend, Jabrayil, Zangilan, and the Syunik Province of Armenia.

Its capital and largest city is Qubadli. As of 2020, the district had a nominal population of 41,600.

History 
The region was part of the Kurdistansky Uyezd and later the Kurdistan Okrug in the Azerbaijani SSR from 7 July 1923 to 23 July 1930. To its Kurdish population, it was known as Qûbadlî.

The district was established on 14 March 1933.

The district came was seized by the breakaway Republic of Artsakh in August 1993 during the First Nagorno-Karabakh War. Azerbaijani forces regained control of all of the district during the 2020 Nagorno-Karabakh war.

Demographics 
According to the last Soviet census of 1989, population was 28,110. According to undated Azerbaijani data, the population was 34,100.

As of 1979 a total of 26,673 people:
 Azerbaijanis 99,5% (26,537)
 Russians 0,2% (45)
 Armenians 0,1% (26)

As of 1989 a total of 28,110 people.

See also 
 Armenian-occupied territories surrounding Nagorno-Karabakh
 Kashatagh Province

References

Gallery

External links 
State Statistical Committee of Azerbaijan Republic. Population of Azerbaijan

 
Districts of Azerbaijan